Route 23 is a city route in Winnipeg, Manitoba, connecting Route 180 (McPhillips Street) and Route 52 (Main Street).

Route 23 is a minor arterial road connecting Main Street and the Garden City business district.  The road is mainly known as Leila Avenue. There is a one-way section between the railroad crossing and Main Street where Leila Avenue is the westbound section of road, and the eastbound section becomes Partridge Avenue.  The speed limit is 60 km/h (37 mph).

History 
Route 23 was originally designated as Route 5 when it was added to the Winnipeg Metro Route system in 1969. The route was changed to its current designation in 1992.

Major intersections

References

023